Adam Jesus Jr. Esparza-Saldana (born February 7, 2002) is an American professional soccer player who plays as a midfielder for Major League Soccer club LA Galaxy.

Club career

LA Galaxy II
Saldana made his professional debut in a 0–1 loss to Reno 1868 on September 15, 2018, coming on as a 31st-minute substitute for Andre Zanga.

LA Galaxy
On January 19, 2021, Saldana was signed to LA Galaxy's MLS roster.

International career
Born in the United States, Saldana who is of Mexican descent, represented the United States national under-17 team at the 2019 FIFA U-17 World Cup.

Personal life
Saldana is of Mexican descent and holds dual American and Mexican citizenship.

Career statistics

Club

References

External links
 
 

2002 births
Living people
People from Panorama City, Los Angeles
Soccer players from Los Angeles
American soccer players
United States men's youth international soccer players
Association football midfielders
LA Galaxy II players
LA Galaxy players
USL Championship players
Homegrown Players (MLS)
Major League Soccer players